Associação Desportiva Confiança, commonly referred to as Confiança, is a Brazilian professional club based in Aracaju, Sergipe founded on 1 May 1936. It competes in the Campeonato Brasileiro Série C, the third tier of Brazilian football, as well as in the Campeonato Sergipano, the top flight of the Sergipe state football league.

Confiança is the top ranked team from Sergipe in CBF's national club ranking, at 44th overall.

History

On May 1, 1936, was founded in Aracaju a club called Associação Desportiva Confiança, after Epaminondas Vital and Isnard Cantalice watched a volleyball match between Cotinguiba and Aracaju at Bairro Industrial (Industrial Neighborhood, in English). Joaquim Sabino Ribeiro Chaves, Epaminondas Vital and Isnard Cantalice then founded a basketball and volleyball club at Bairro Industrial.

In 1949, the club competed in its first football competition, earning the nickname Dragão do Bairro Industrial, meaning Industrial Neighborhood Dragon, and playing in blue and white colors.

On May 1, 1955, Confiança, through its paranymph, called Joaquim Sabino Ribeiro Chaves, built its stadium, named Proletário Sabino Ribeiro.

In 1976, the club played for the first time in the Campeonato Brasileiro First Division.

In 1989, the club competed in the first edition of Copa do Brasil, being eliminated in the first round by Bahia after two 0–1 defeats.

In 2004, Confiança competed in the Campeonato Brasileiro Série C, being eliminated in the third stage by Villa Nova.

Achievements

Football
Campeonato Sergipano: 22
1951, 1954, 1962, 1963, 1965, 1968, 1976, 1977, 1983, 1986, 1988, 1990,2000, 2001, 2002, 2004, 2008, 2009, 2014, 2015, 2017, 2020

Copa Governo do Estado de Sergipe: 4
2003, 2005, 2008, 2012

Futsal
Campeonato do Nordeste: 2
2001

Campeonato Sergipano: 2
2001

Current squad

First team squad

Reserve team

Club name
The club's name means Confidence in Portuguese, and is named after a factory called Fábrica Confiança.

Ultras
Torcida Trovão Azul
Torcida Jovem
Movimento Azulino

References

External links
Fansite
DragãoNET
Torcida Trovão Azul

 
Association football clubs established in 1936
Confianca
1936 establishments in Brazil